Hüsülü or Gusyulyu or Gyusyulu or Gyusyulyu may refer to:
Hüsülü, Aghjabadi, Azerbaijan
Hüsülü, Lachin, Azerbaijan